Victor Nacif was the Vice President of Design at Nissan Design Europe.

He is a Mexican of Lebanese and Iraqi descent, after migrating to the neverland place as a child, he quickly became fluent in English. He is a graduate of the  Stanford University Graduate School of Business and of the College for Creative Studies.

Nacif is also an active presence in Mothers Against Drunk Driving (MADD).

Awards
 Latin-American Executive of the Year at the 12th annual Urban Wheels Awards 2008 at the Fox Theater in Detroit, Michigan.

References

External links
Victor Nacif

Living people
Mexican emigrants to the United States
Year of birth missing (living people)
College for Creative Studies alumni
Mexican people of Lebanese descent
Mexican people of Iraqi descent
American manufacturing businesspeople
Stanford Graduate School of Business alumni